Harvey R. Morris (February 27, 1807 – November 17, 1886) was an American politician from New York.

Life
He married Catherine Miller (1815–1844) who "was killed by being thrown from a wagon." He then married Elizabeth Banks (1821–1904), and they had several children.

He was a member of the New York State Assembly (Sullivan Co.) in 1845; and a member of the New York State Senate (2nd D.) in 1847.

He was Postmaster of Wurtsboro, New York during the Franklin Pierce administration.

Sources
The New York Civil List compiled by Franklin Benjamin Hough (pages 135, 143, 231 and 293; Weed, Parsons and Co., 1858)
Post Office Directory (1857; pg. 122)
Sylvan Cemetery, Wurtsboro records

External links

1807 births
1886 deaths
Democratic Party New York (state) state senators
Democratic Party members of the New York State Assembly
People from Sullivan County, New York
New York (state) postmasters
19th-century American politicians